The 1842 Vermont gubernatorial election was held on September 6, 1842.

Incumbent Whig Governor Charles Paine defeated Democratic nominee Nathan Smilie and Liberty nominee Charles K. Williams with 50.85% of the vote.

General election

Candidates
Charles Paine, Whig, incumbent Governor
Nathan Smilie, Democratic, businessman, former member of the Vermont General Assembly, Democratic candidate for Governor in 1839 and 1841
Charles K. Williams, Liberty, incumbent Chief Judge of the Vermont Supreme Court

Results

Notes

References

1842
Vermont
Gubernatorial